Euphorbia microsciadia is a species of flowering plant in the spurge family, Euphorbiaceae, native to western Asia. It grows in semidesert in rocky and sandy soils.

References

microsciadia